The provinces of the Democratic Republic of the Congo are divided into territories (fr. territoires, sing. territoire) and cities (fr. villes, sing. ville). The 145 territories are listed below, in alphabetical order, along with the provinces after and before the 2015 reorganization:

Territories

See also
 Number of deputies for each constituency by province
 Subdivisions of the Democratic Republic of the Congo
 Provinces of the Democratic Republic of the Congo
 Chiefdoms and sectors of the Democratic Republic of the Congo

References 

 
Subdivisions of the Democratic Republic of the Congo
Congo, Democratic Republic of, Territories
Congo, Democratic Republic of 2
Territories, Congo
Democratic Republic of the Congo geography-related lists